A vertex model is a type of statistical mechanics model in which the Boltzmann weights are associated with a vertex in the model (representing an atom or particle). This contrasts with a nearest-neighbour model, such as the Ising model, in which the energy, and thus the Boltzmann weight of a statistical microstate is attributed to the bonds connecting two neighbouring particles. The energy associated with a vertex in the lattice of particles is thus dependent on the state of the bonds which connect it to adjacent vertices. It turns out that every solution of the Yang–Baxter equation with spectral parameters in a tensor product of vector spaces  yields an exactly-solvable vertex model.

Although the model can be applied to various geometries in any number of dimensions, with any number of possible states for a given bond, the most fundamental examples occur for two dimensional lattices, the simplest being a square lattice where each bond has two possible states. In this model, every particle is connected to four other particles, and each of the four bonds adjacent to the particle has two possible states, indicated by the direction of an arrow on the bond. In this model, each vertex can adopt  possible configurations. As the energy is often divergent for an infinite lattice, the model is studied for a finite lattice as the lattice approaches infinite size. Periodic or domain wall boundary conditions may be imposed on the model.

Discussion
For a given state of the lattice, the Boltzmann weight can be written as the product over the vertices of the Boltzmann weights of the corresponding vertex states

where the Boltzmann weights for the vertices are written

,

and the i, j, k, l range over the possible statuses of each of the four edges attached to the vertex. The vertex states of adjacent vertices must satisfy compatibility conditions along the connecting edges (bonds) in order for the state to be admissible.

The probability of the system being in any given state at a particular time, and hence the properties of the system are determined by the partition function, for which an analytic form is desired.

where β=1/kT, T is temperature and k is Boltzmann's constant. The probability that the system is in any given state (microstate) is given by 

so that the average value of the energy of the system is given by

In order to evaluate the partition function, firstly examine the states of a row of vertices.

The external edges are free variables, with summation over the internal bonds. Hence, form the row partition function

thereby implying that T can be written as

where the indices indicate the factors of the tensor product  on which R operates. Summing over the states of the bonds in the first row with the periodic boundary conditions , gives

where  is the row-transfer matrix.

By summing the contributions over two rows, the result is

which upon summation over the vertical bonds connecting the first two rows gives:

for M rows, this gives

and then applying the periodic boundary conditions to the vertical columns, the partition function can be expressed in terms of the transfer matrix  as

This in itself is another field of study. This implies that the eigenspaces are common, and restricts the possible space of solutions. Such a family of commuting operators is usually found by means of the Yang–Baxter equation, which thus relates statistical mechanics to the study of quantum groups.

Integrability 
Definition: A vertex model is integrable if,  such that

This is a parameterized version of the Yang–Baxter equation, corresponding to the possible dependence of the vertex energies, and hence the Boltzmann weights R on external parameters, such as temperature, external fields, etc.

The integrability condition implies the following relation.

This illustrates the role of the Yang–Baxter equation in the solution of solvable lattice models. It is a recurring theme which appears in many other types of statistical mechanical models to look for these commuting transfer matrices.

This motivates the classification of all the finite-dimensional irreducible representations of a given Quantum algebra in order to find solvable models corresponding to it.

Notable vertex models 
 Six-vertex model

 Eight-vertex model

Nineteen-vertex model (Izergin-Korepin model)

References 

Statistical mechanics
Lattice models